The Order of the Bahamas is an honour that can be given by the government of the Bahamas. It was founded in 2016.

References

 http://laws.bahamas.gov.bs/cms/images/LEGISLATION/PRINCIPAL/2016/2016-0001/NationalHonoursAct2016_1.pdf

Orders, decorations, and medals of the Bahamas
Awards established in 2016
2016 establishments in the Bahamas